Thomas Enqvist was the defending champion but lost in the quarterfinals to Todd Martin.

Pete Sampras won in the final 7–6(7–3), 7–5 against Goran Ivanišević.

Seeds
The top eight seeds received a bye to the second round.

  Pete Sampras (champion)
  Goran Ivanišević (final)
  Andre Agassi (second round)
  Thomas Enqvist (quarterfinals)
  Todd Martin (semifinals)
  Richey Reneberg (third round)
  Jason Stoltenberg (second round)
  Renzo Furlan (second round)
  Stefan Edberg (third round)
  Mark Woodforde (third round)
  Àlex Corretja (quarterfinals)
  Tim Henman (first round)
  Bohdan Ulihrach (semifinals)
  Todd Woodbridge (second round)
  Filip Dewulf (first round)
  Petr Korda (third round)

Draw

Finals

Top half

Section 1

Section 2

Bottom half

Section 3

Section 4

References
 1996 RCA Championships Draw

1996 Singles
RCA Championships,1996,Singles